The Fiat X1/9 is a two-seater mid-engined sports car designed by Bertone and manufactured by Fiat from 1972–1982 and subsequently by Gruppo Bertone from 1982–1989.

With a transverse engine and gearbox in a mid-mounted, rear-wheel drive configuration, the X1/9 was noted for its balanced handling, retractable headlights, lightweight removable hardtop which could be stowed under the bonnet, front and rear storage compartments — and for being the first Fiat to have been designed from its conception to meet US safety regulations.

History

Design and development

The X1/9 was developed from the 1969 Autobianchi A112 Runabout concept, with styling by Bertone under chief designer Marcello Gandini.

Even though the Runabout was named for the Autobianchi A112, it was powered by a version of the brand new Fiat 128 SOHC engine. The Runabout featured a distinctive wedge shape and took many styling cues from contemporary power-boat design. Though the more extreme features of the Runabout such as the C pillar mounted headlights and the small wind-deflector windscreen were lost for the production car, many aesthetic features of the Autobianchi Runabout are readily identifiable on the X1/9. The long flat bonnet with central indentation, the large front overhang, the wedge shape with prominent C-pillar roll-over hoop and the car-length indented waterline all made the successful transition to the X1/9, giving it a highly distinctive appearance.

Designed around the Fiat SOHC engine and transmission from the front wheel drive Fiat 128, the X1/9 relocated the transverse drive train and suspension assembly from the front of the 128 to the rear of the passenger cabin, directly in front of the rear axle, giving a mid-engined layout. The engine was designed by Aurelio Lampredi, famed Ferrari engine designer before he went to work for FIAT (the parent company, at that time). The fuel tank and spare wheel were located ahead of the engine, behind the driver and passenger seats respectively — optimizing the proportion of the car's weight within its wheelbase for more balanced handling and enabling cargo areas front and rear.

Once developed for production, the two-seater featured sharp-edged styling with a wedge shape, retractable headlights, an integrated front spoiler and a removable hard top roof panel (targa top). The removable hardtop could be stored in the front boot; a second luggage compartment was provided at the rear of the car, accessible through a conventional boot lid.

Unlike Fiat's marketing nomenclature at the time which used a numerical system (e.g., 127, 128, 124, 131) denoting relative position in the model range, the X1/9 retained its prototype code as its marketing name. Fiat's prototype coding used X0 for engines, X1 for passenger vehicles and X2 for commercial vehicles. The X1/9 was thus the ninth passenger car developed using the nomenclature.

Production and model evolution
Originally slated to debut at the November 1972 Turin Motor Show, the X1/9's launch was delayed until after the show to avoid upstaging the new Fiat 126 city car. Press test drives were held at the end of November 1972, on the Sicilian Madonie roads home to the Targa Florio road race.

The car was intended to replace the 850 Spider, another Bertone design, not the larger and pricier 124 Sport Spider whose production continued for much of the X1/9's life. The car's monocoque body was produced at the Bertone factory in Grugliasco (Turin) and then transported to the Fiat's Lingotto factory for final assembly. As mentioned before, the X1/9's type 128 AS  single overhead cam inline-four engine was derived from the Fiat 128, specifically from the 128 Coupé 1300.

Changes included a new cast aluminium oil sump, complementing the aluminium cylinder head.
The all-synchronized 4-speed transmission was also carried over from the 128, though with a taller fourth gear ratio to exploit the sports car's better aerodynamics.

As standard the X1/9 came with 4.5J×13-inch stamped steel wheels fitted with  tyres, while cast alloy wheels were an extra-cost option.

Suspension was fully independent, with MacPherson struts front and rear. The split circuit brake system used equally sized  solid discs all around. Steering was rack and pinion.

The interior, upholstered in leatherette, featured two bucket seats with integrated headrests and a four-spoke steering wheel (resembling the one fitted to the Lamborghini Marzal). The engine cover and rear trunk could be opened with (lockable) interior latches located on the driver's side door jamb.

The original 1.3-litre, 4-speed X1/9 can be distinguished from the later 1.5-litre, 5-speed model by its wrap-around steel split bumpers with rubber blocks, and the shallower engine compartment lid.

Fiat began marketing a right-hand drive variant in 1976. Prior to this, Radbourne Racing had been converting left-hand drive X1/9s to a right-hand drive configuration for sale in the UK market. None of these early conversions are believed to remain in existence.

In 1982, shortly after the introduction of the 1500 model, complete production was assumed by Bertone with models subsequently badged as the "Bertone" X1/9. Bertone models featured revised footwells redesigned to enhance legroom and sitting comfort for persons taller than the original design's target.

The last production models were named the Gran Finale and sold over the 1989/1990 period. They were a dealer modification of the special edition (commonly abbreviated to SE) of 1988/1989, with the addition of a rear spoiler and "gran finale" badges.

The X1/9 in the United States

Reported numbers vary by source, but about 2/3 of the approximately 160,000 X1/9s produced were sold in the USA. Three generations of X1/9 were sold in the U.S.: 1974 cars, 1975-1978 cars, and 1979-1989 cars.

The 1974 U.S. examples aligned closely with worldwide models, including small (but U.S.-specific) bumpers,  1290 cc engines, and four-speed transmissions.

The 1975-1978 U.S. cars were unique to the U.S. market with "ladder-style" impact absorbing bumpers front and rear. To meet U.S. evaporative and exhaust emission standards, X1/9s were fitted with exhaust gas recirculation valves, air pumps and activated charcoal systems.

The 1979 U.S. cars retained the previous emission controls. Model years 1980 and 1981 saw a transition from carburetion to Bosch L-Jetronic fuel injection, with the changeover coming in 1980 for cars sold in California and a gradual changeover for "federal" cars from late 1980 to 1981 model years. The combination of fuel injection (FI), a catalytic converter and unleaded gasoline allowed these cars to meet California's and later federal emission standards.

In 1979 U.S. X1/9s also received both exterior and interior revisions including integrated bumpers front and rear, as well as new front grilles and airdams. The instrument panel and dash redesign moved the heating and ventilation controls from the center console up to the main dash, relocated the radio to the center dash area, moved the fuse panel from the area above the driver's left knee to the area above the passenger's footwell where the glovebox was, and moved the glovebox to atop the dash.

During 1982, Fiat ended its presence in the U.S. Fiat turned over marketing and support of the X1/9 to International Automobile Importers, Inc., headed by Malcolm Bricklin, and turned over full production duties to Bertone.

In 1983 the orphaned X1/9 was sold as the "Bertone X1/9". IAI and Bertone continued to update the X1/9, providing improved rust protection, revised seating to accommodate taller drivers, and a modernized electrical system for 1984 models.

U.S. sales of the X1/9 fell in the final few years, and 1987 was the last year that IAI imported X1/9s to the U.S.

From mid-1987 to end of the production in 1989, Bertone X1/9s were imported to the U.S. by M.I.K. Automotive, Inc. in North Hollywood, California, owned by Miro Kefurt, who at that time was the number one Bertone dealer in the U.S. and one of the very few that sold exclusively X1/9s. The last four X1/9s were imported to the U.S. in April 1990 (1989 model year cars, produced in December 1989).

Technical specifications

Concept cars and prototypes

Bertone conducted at least three design and engineering studies with the X1/9. Along with several standard X1/9s taken from the production line, examples of all three design studies are now on display in the Volandia Museum adjacent to the Malpensa/Milan airport, which is the new home of the majority of the Bertone collection that was sold after the company went through final bankruptcy proceedings.

Fiat X1/9 Superlight 

An all-aluminum X1/9 body shell was developed in concert with ALCAN. Five all-aluminum cars, dubbed "Superlight" (not Superleggera), were built to the same strength and stiffness of the normal steel cars, and tested for vibration, noise, high load input, and corrosion. The program also tested the specially developed adhesives and techniques used to assemble bodyshell components. Weight savings were 1/3 of the normal steel body. Since a 24-hour Showroom Stock endurance race was expected to reveal a lot about the durability of aluminum cars, one of these aluminum-bodied prototypes was entered into the 1987 Longest Day of Nelson Ledges race, but a mishap on a test and tune practice lap prevented the car from running the race.

Fiat X1/9 "Passo Lungo" 

The second design study was a 2+1 completed in 1981, dubbed "Passo Lungo." Two inches of width was added to the entire car, and more than seven inches of length was added behind the door and ahead of the rear wheels. The spare tire was relocated to the new space behind the driver's seat, and a third seat was added to the space behind the passenger seat originally used for the spare tire. "Opera" windows were added to the sail panels. The stock 1.5L engine was replaced by the 2.0L DOHC FIAT engine to add more power to compensate for the added weight.

Only one example is known to exist which is currently on display with the Bertone collection in Volandia. In stretching the body, the targa roof also had to be made longer and could no longer be stowed in the front boot of the car (as it had been designed for in the normal X1/9).

Fiat X1/9 Spider 

The third study was a full-convertible top (Spider) version of the X1/9. The fixed rear window and sail panels were deleted, and a more conventional roll bar/hoop was added for rollover protection. A fascia was fabricated to mate with the engine compartment lid to cover the body shoulders where the sails panels used to be. The convertible top is not a structure that emerges from behind the passenger compartment area; rather it is a flexible cover that mounts using the original targa top clips along the windshield in front, stretches over and is supported by the new roll bar, and is secured into place in the rear with twist-clips.

Racing

Filipinetti
The Filipinetti X1/9 of Scuderia Filipinetti was presented first at the Geneva Motor Show in March 1973 as the first Fiat X1/9 race car. It was built in cooperation with Fiat by the technician and racer Mike Parkes who later developed and built the Lancia Stratos. The Filipinetti had a 1290 cc engine with Lucas mechanical fuel injection and a Colotti five-speed gearbox.

Abarth

The Fiat subsidiary Abarth, in 1973, developed the Abarth X1/9 Prototipo to replace the 124 Spider Abarth as Fiat's main rally car. Ultimately, the parallel 131 Abarth project was chosen over the X1/9 as the main rally competition platform.

The X1/9 Prototipo used an 1840 cc engine (a bored out 1600 cc 124-derived unit) with a custom 16-valve cylinder head fed by twin 44 mm Weber IDF carburettors. Externally the cars sported flared wheel-arches, a small "duck tail" spoiler and an F1 style air intake designed to feed the carburettors cool air from above the cars roof. All the X1/9 Prototipos were raced in the traditional Abarth lime-green/yellow and orange/pink colour scheme.

The prototype nature of the X1/9 Prototipo project means that the exact number of cars produced is impossible to define. Components and entire body-shells were routinely swapped and replaced as part of the development process, but it is believed that 5 genuine cars were produced.

Dallara Icsunonove

In 1975 the X1/9 was chosen by Dallara to enter the World Championship for Makes in the Group 5 Special Production class. The Dallara Icsunonove (the Italian pronunciation of "X1/9") featured a modified X1/9 engine with a custom 16-valve cylinder-head and fundamental suspension and body/monocoque alterations, the most obvious of which are the massively flared wheel-arches and the oversized rear wing.

Kit conversions

Faran
The Faran Car Co. Ltd. was a UK based company that offered their Eliminator kit in both DIY and in-house assembled form. The design featured replacement fibreglass mouldings for the front and rear wings together with front and rear integrated bumper sections. The external modifications were completed by side sill skirts and a rear boot spoiler not dissimilar in style to that found on a De Tomaso Pantera. Faran also offered conversions using Lancia or Fiat Twin Cam engine units, although some owners opted to keep the original SOHC setup. Production of the Faran kits ended following a factory fire.

Eurosport

Eurosport (UK) Ltd. is an X1/9 parts specialist that produced two kit variants commonly referred to as the full and bolt-on kits. The full kit was a contender to the Faran version and utilises wide replacement fibreglass moldings for the front and rear wings, together with front and rear integrated bumper sections. Side skirts completed the styling which featured Ferrari Testarossa style side air intake mouldings ahead of the rear wheels. The bolt-on kit in contrast featured replacement front and rear integrated bumper sections that were moulded to blend with the standard wings. This allowed the 1500 alloy bumpers to be substituted with ease and offer a more modern appearance. Side sill skirts were also included in the bolt-on kit. Both kits are still available today.

Schult
The Schult X1/9 kit was produced in Germany and could again be likened to have taken some inspiration from the Testarossa style, but with more angular lines. Current availability for the Schult conversion is unknown.

The X1/9 Today

UK 
In 2020, fewer than 300 X1/9s are road legal in the UK. There is, however, an active owners club and with over 1,000 registered SORN plenty of scope for this to increase. The club produces a quarterly magazine, attends and organises events, and provides advice on the maintenance of the car.

USA and Canada 
While over 100,000 of the approximately 160,000 X1/9s produced by FIAT and Bertone were sold in the USA and Canada, a mere fraction of that number remain on the roads of those two countries. The latest available figures are from the fall of 2018, at which time 1,034 X1/9s were legally plated for road operation in the USA and 115 were legally plated for road operation in Canada.

See also
 Corona Dardo, a Fiat X1/9 replica sold by Fiat dealers in Brazil.

Notes
 X1/9 is correctly pronounced in Italian as Icsunonove: 'x' (ics) 'one' (uno) 'nine' (nove). Phonetically iks-oo-no-nov-eh. English speaking countries pronounce the name as 'x-one-nine'.

References

External links

  – About the first X1/9 racecar from Scuderia Filipinetti
  The Bertone Runabout concept-car - History by Tobias Berger
 1969 Bertone Runabout Information
 X1/9 North America forum

X1 9
Mid-engined cars
Rear mid-engine, rear-wheel-drive vehicles
Coupés
Roadsters
1980s cars
Cars introduced in 1972
Bertone vehicles
Cars powered by transverse 4-cylinder engines